Carl Jackson "Jack" Gordon Jr. (December 29, 1944 – May 7, 2011) was an American Democratic politician from Mississippi.

Born in Tupelo, Mississippi, Gordon served in the Mississippi House of Representatives 1972–80. He later served in the Mississippi State Senate from 1980 to 1992, and then again from 1996 until his death from brain cancer at his home in Okolona, Mississippi, aged 66.

He was married to the former Martha Ann Estes.

References

External links
Mississippi State Senate - Jack Gordon official website

Democratic Party members of the Mississippi House of Representatives
Democratic Party Mississippi state senators
Deaths from brain cancer in the United States
Deaths from cancer in Mississippi
Neurological disease deaths in Mississippi
People from Tupelo, Mississippi
People from Okolona, Mississippi
1944 births
2011 deaths